Young Engineers/ Future Leaders is a Standing Committee of the World Federation of Engineering Organizations.  Its membership includes engineering students and engineers are the start of their careers.

The current chair is Zainab Garashi from Kuwait. Vice Chair is Kathryn Johnson from United States and secretary is Christopher Chukwunta from Nigeria.

Structure
The YE/FL is run by the YE/FL council. The YE/FL Council is the highest decision making board. Each national engineering association is asked to appoint one official delegate for the YE/FL Council. The Council meets at the regular committee meeting.

While absence of the YE/FL council the chair manages the main tasks, which are to guide the committee through its work, take care of administrative YE/FL responsibilities in between official meetings, to moderate official meetings, and set mile stones to help handle matters on time.

YE/FL represented nations
 Argentina 
 Australia 
 Bahrain 
 Bangladesh 
 Belize 
 Brazil 
 Costa Rica 
 China 
 Egypt 
 Germany 
 Honduras 
 India 
 Italy 
 Kenya
 Kuwait 
 Lebanon 
 Nigeria 
 Pakistan 
 Peru 
 Sierra Leone 
 Singapore 
 South Africa 
 Switzerland 
 Taiwan, China 
 Tanzania 
 UAE 
 United States 
 United States 
 Zimbabwe

References

External links
Official YE/FL website

Engineering societies
International scientific organizations
Organizations based in Paris
Organizations established in 2009
UNESCO
Youth science